Panagiotis Liagas (born 5 November 1999) is a Greek professional footballer who plays as a centre-back for Super League club Levadiakos.

Honours
Levadiakos
Super League 2: 2021–22

References

1999 births
Living people
Greek footballers
Greece under-21 international footballers
Super League Greece players
Super League Greece 2 players
Levadiakos F.C. players
Association football defenders
People from Evrytania
Footballers from Central Greece